Swept Overboard (February 6, 1997 - November 1, 2017) was an American Thoroughbred racehorse and the winner of the 2002 Metropolitan Handicap.

Career

Swept Overboard's first race was on October 9, 1999, at Santa Anita, where he came in 2nd place.

He then went on a three race win streak, starting off the year 2000 with wins at the San Miguel Stakes and the San Pedro Stakes.

Starting with his win at the June 23rd, 2001 Robert K. Kerlan Memorial Handicap, he began competing only in graded races.

He picked up his next big win on October 6, 2001, by winning the Ancient Title Stakes. He then picked up another win to close the year by winning the November 23rd, 2001, Hollywood Turf Express Handicap.

He picked up the final win of his career by winning the 2002 Metropolitan Handicap. He then finished out his career with a 4th place finish at the 2002 Ancient Title Stakes and an 8th place finish at the 2002 Breeders' Cup Sprint.

Stud career
At the end of his racing career Swept Overboard was sold to Japanese interests where he stood at stud at Shadai Stallion Station in 2003 then in 2008 was moved to Breeders Stallion Station.

Swept Overboard's descendants include:

c = colt, f = filly

Pedigree

References

1997 racehorse births
2017 racehorse deaths
Thoroughbred racehorses
Racehorses bred in Florida
Racehorses trained in the United States
American racehorses
Thoroughbred family 8-f